William Suttor may refer to:
 William Henry Suttor, Australian pastoralist and politician
 William Suttor Jr., his son, Australian politician and pastoralist